Thomas Durant may refer to:

 Thomas C. Durant (1820–1885), American financier and railroad promoter
Thomas Durant (15th-century politician) (fl. 1401–1406), MP for Bedfordshire (UK Parliament constituency)
Thomas Durant (teller), Teller of the Receipt of the Exchequer, c. 1362–98

See also
Thomas Frank Durrant, VC (1918–1942), English soldier
Sir Thomas Durrant, 1st Baronet (c. 1733–1790), English MP for St Ives, 1768–74
Durant (disambiguation)